The 2014–15 Portland Pilots men's basketball team represented the University of Portland during the 2014–15 NCAA Division I men's basketball season. The Pilots, led by ninth-year head coach Eric Reveno, played their home games at the Chiles Center and were members of the West Coast Conference. They finished the season 17–16, 7–11 in WCC play to finish in a three-way tie for sixth place. They advanced to the semifinals of the WCC tournament where they lost to BYU. They were invited to the CollegeInsdier.com Tournament where they lost in the first round to Sacramento State.

Previous season 
The Pilots finished the season 15–16, 7–11 in WCC play to finish in a tie for sixth place. They lost in the first round of the West Coast Conference tournament to Loyola Marymount.

Departures

Recruitment

Recruitment Class of 2015

Roster

Schedule and results

|-
!colspan=9 style="background:#461D7C; color:#FFFFFF;"| Exhibition

|-
!colspan=9 style="background:#461D7C; color:#FFFFFF;"| Regular season

|-
!colspan=9 style="background:#461D7C;"| WCC tournament

|-
!colspan=9 style="background:#461D7C;"| CIT

Source: Schedule

See also
2014–15 Portland Pilots women's basketball team

References

Portland
Portland Pilots men's basketball seasons
Portland Pilots men's basketball
Portland Pilots men's basketball
Portland
Port
Port